J. E. Michel Bastarache  (born 1947) is a Canadian lawyer, businessman, and retired puisne justice on the Supreme Court of Canada.

Early life and education
Born in Quebec City on June 10, 1947, Bastarache earned his Bachelor of Arts degree from the Université de Moncton in 1967. He received a Licence d'études supérieures en droit public from the University of Nice in 1972. He received a Bachelor of Law degree from the University of Ottawa in 1978. He was called to the New Brunswick Bar in 1980, the Alberta Bar in 1985, and the Ontario Bar in 1986.

Career
From 1970 to 1971, he was a legal translator for the Province of New Brunswick. In 1973, he was the general secretary for the Société des Acadiens et Acadiennes du Nouveau-Brunswick. In 1974, he was the assistant to the president of Assumption Mutual Life, becoming director of sales in 1975, and vice-president of marketing in 1976.

In 1978, he joined the Université de Moncton as a law professor and was dean of the Law School from 1980 to 1983. From 1983 to 1984, he was the director general for the promotion of official languages in the Department of the Secretary of State of Canada. From 1984 to 1987, he was the associate dean of the Common Law section of the University of Ottawa.

In 1987, he joined the firm of Lang Michener Lash Johnston, becoming a partner in 1988. From 1989 to 1994, he was the president and Chief Executive Officer of Assumption Mutual Life. In 1994, he moved back to Moncton to practice at Stewart McKelvey Stirling Scales. He was appointed to the New Brunswick Court of Appeal in 1995 and then promoted to the Supreme Court in 1997.

Bastarache retired from the Supreme Court, effective June 30, 2008, and joined the Ottawa office of Canadian law firm Heenan Blaikie. After the collapse of Heenan Blaikie in 2014, he became affiliated with the Canadian law firm Power Law, with offices in Ottawa, Moncton and Vancouver. As of 2018, Bastarache is counsel at Ottawa-based bilingual litigation firm Caza Saikaley srl/LLP.

Bastarache was made a Companion of the Order of Canada in recognition "for his lifelong commitment to the promotion of linguistic duality and the protection of minority rights, as a law professor and a judge" in 2009.

At a news conference in Ottawa on October 6, 2016, it was announced that Bastarache had been named to administer the settlement of the class-action sexual harassment lawsuit against the RCMP by acting as an independent assessor of the claims to be submitted. Bastarache stated his intention to contact the greatest number of claimants possible and to interview many of them personally. He explained that to ensure the confidentiality of the claimants, the federal government would transfer to a fiduciary account under his control the amounts required for the compensation payments and that he would make the payments directly to claimants. Bastarache was designated the "sole and independent decision maker" for the claims process. His decisions in the matter were not open to review by the RCMP or appeal by the parties.(Settlement news conference Oct. 6, 2016)

See also
 Reasons of the Supreme Court of Canada by Justice Bastarache

References
"Establishing Official Languages in the Canadian Charter of Rights and Freedoms" at Library and Archives Canada

External links
 Supreme Court of Canada bio

1947 births
Businesspeople from New Brunswick
Canadian university and college faculty deans
Companions of the Order of Canada
French Quebecers
Justices of the Supreme Court of Canada
Living people
Lawyers in New Brunswick
People from Moncton
People from Quebec City
Canadian people of Basque descent
Université de Moncton alumni
University of Ottawa alumni
Université de Montréal alumni
Université de Montréal Faculty of Law alumni
University of Ottawa Faculty of Law alumni
Academic staff of the Université de Moncton
Côte d'Azur University alumni
Lawyers in Ontario
Lawyers in Alberta
Academic staff of the University of Ottawa